Mengcheng County is a county in the northwest of Anhui Province, China. It is under the administration of Bozhou city, bordering Lixin County. It is famous for its beef production and for Zhuangzi, 4th century BCE philosopher. Niu Qun, a well-known comedian, used to serve as deputy magistrate of Mengcheng County.

Administrative divisions
In the present, Mengcheng County has 13 towns, 2 townships and 2 others.
13 towns

2 townships
 Xiaoxinji
 Wangji

2 Others
 Fanji Industrial Park
 Baiyang Forestry

Climate

References

External links
Official website of Mengcheng County Government

Bozhou